Austrocidaria gobiata is a species of moth of the family Geometridae. It endemic to New Zealand.

References

Xanthorhoini
Moths of New Zealand
Moths described in 1875
Endemic fauna of New Zealand
Taxa named by Rudolf Felder
Taxa named by  Alois Friedrich Rogenhofer
Endemic moths of New Zealand